The Palisades Sill is a fine-grained porphyritic dacite sill which forms spectacular cliffs and palisades in the Cimarron River canyon between Eagle Nest and Cimarron in northern New Mexico.  It can be seen in the eastern part of Cimarron Canyon State Park.

References

Igneous petrology of New Mexico
Sills (geology)